Kungen kommer is a 1936 Swedish comedy film directed by Ragnar Hyltén-Cavallius. It starrs Gösta Ekman, Birgit Tengroth, Åke Ohberg, Tollie Zellman and Håkan Westergren.

Plot
It is the year of 1865 and the Löwencreutz family are expecting a very prominent visitor, King Charles XV is coming to stay. However Carl Henrik von Grimm reads a telegram stating that the King is in fact cancelling his visit.

At the theatre that night Grimm notices the actor Leonard Petterson who happens to resemble the king a great deal. This gives Grimm an idea that could work in his favour. Can he hire the actor to play the King and get away with it?

Cast

References

External links

1936 films
1930s historical comedy-drama films
Swedish historical films
1930s Swedish-language films
Films directed by Ragnar Hyltén-Cavallius
Films based on operettas
Swedish black-and-white films
Swedish comedy-drama films
1936 comedy films
1936 drama films
1930s Swedish films